Clang of the Yankee Reaper is the third studio album by Van Dyke Parks, released in 1976. It continues his exploration of calypso music started in the previous album Discover America (1972). In particular, it contains several songs by Mighty Sparrow and Lord Kitchener, as well as a diverse selection of past and present music in the tradition of the Americas. It is primarily cover versions, and contains only one original Parks composition. The album was dedicated to the late Frederick Mears Wainwright.

Parks has reflected harshly of the album years later, describing it as "brain dead". He added, "That album was done at the nadir of my entire life. Psychologically I was in a terrible state, I was despairing. My best friend had just died – my roommate, he was my roommate. We scattered his ashes at sea, and they flew back into our faces... a terrible, terrible insult. I was grieving, I'd just been divorced, I'd just left Warner Brothers in disgust as I didn't want to be a corporate lackey, didn't approve of record business practices – you know, what can I say? 'Lost my job, the truck blew up, my dog died.'"

The title is taken from a poem by Parks' great-uncle Will Carleton.

Track listing
"Clang of the Yankee Reaper" (Martin Kibbee, Trevor Lawrence, Van Dyke Parks) – 3:41
"City on the Hill" (Winston Monseque) – 3:00
"Pass That Stage" (Mighty Sparrow) – 3:00
"Another Dream" (The Sandpebbles of Barbabos) – 2:54
"You're a Real Sweetheart" (Irving Caesar, Cliff Friend) – 1:12
"Love Is the Answer" (F. Williams) – 3:28
"Iron Man" (Stanley "Squibby" Cummings) – 3:05
"Tribute to Spree" (Lord Kitchener) – 3:37
"Soul Train" (Lord Kitchener) – 3:12
"Canon in D" (Johann Pachelbel) – 2:42

Notes:
 Lord Kitchener is referred to as Aldwyn Roberts, and Mighty Sparrow as Slinger Francisco.
 Track 7, is often cited by other artists to be a Lord Kitchener (Aldwyn Roberts) composition.
 Track 10, listed as Pachelbel's Canon in D is in actuality "Ein feste Burg ist unser Gott" by Martin Luther, or as it is known in English, "A Mighty Fortress is Our God". It is also not in D, but Ab.

Personnel
Van Dyke Parks - vocals
Jesse Ed Davis, Fred Tackett - guitar
Chili Charles, Robert Greenidge, Hugh Borde, Jim Keltner - drums
Bobby Keys - saxophone
Klaus Voormann - bass guitar
Hollis Durity - congas
Malcolm Cecil - synthesizer
Noble Williams
Trevor Lawrence - arrangements
Bob Thompson - orchestration on "Canon in D"
Technical
Donn Landee, Lee Herschberg, Richard Moore, Serge Reyes - engineers
Henry Defreitas, Hugh Borde, Sandy Jules - research
Ed Thrasher - art direction, photographer

References

External links
Clang of the Yankee Reaper lyrics

1976 albums
Warner Records albums
Van Dyke Parks albums